Pierre Droulers (born 5 July 1951 in La Madeleine, France) is a French and Belgian choreographer and dancer.

He spent three years in artistic training at Maurice Béjart's Mudra School in Brussels and then studied with Jerzy Grotowski in Poland. Later, he participated in Bob Wilson's workshops in Paris. In 1978, during a trip in New York City, he discovered Steve Paxton's work which was a source of inspiration.

Since September 2005, he has been co-directing Charleroi/Danses, the Choreographic Centre of the French Community, with Michèle Anne De Mey, Thierry De Mey and Vincent Thirion.

Creations 
 1976–1978: Dispersion
 1976–1978: Désert
 1978–1979: Hedges (solo with saxophonist Steve Lacy)
 1978–1979: Everlone
 1980–1981: Tao (with Sherryl Sutton)
 1981–1982: Tips (with the future Grand Magasin)
 1982–1983: Pieces for Nothing (original music by Minimal Compact)
 1983–1984: La Jetée
 1984–1985: Miserere (with Winston Tong and Sussan Deyhim)
 1985–1986: Midi Minuit
 1985–1986: Improvisation (movie)
 1986–1987: Face à face (with Michèle Anne De Mey)
 1987–1988: Cadavres Exquis
 1991: Remains (with saxophonist Steve Lacy)
 1991: Comme si on était leurs Petits Poucets
 1992: Humeurs
 1993: Jamais de l'Abîme
 1995: Mountain/Fountain (with Belgian artist Michel François)
 1996: Les Beaux Jours
 1996: De l'Air et du Vent
 1997: Petites Formes
 1998: Multum in Parvo
 1999: Aventures, Nouvelles Aventures by György Ligeti (with Jim Clayburgh)
 1999: Sortie
 2001: MA (with Michel François, Ann Veronica Janssens and Yuji Oshima)
 2002: Sames (duo with Stefan Dreher)
 2004: Inouï (with Ann Veronica Janssens)
 2007: Flowers
 2009: Walk Talk Chalk

References 

 Charleroi/Danses's Who's who
  Pierre Droulers short biography

External links 
 Company Pierre Droulers

1951 births
Living people
Ballet choreographers
Belgian male dancers
Belgian choreographers
Contemporary dance choreographers
French male dancers
French choreographers
Contemporary dancers